The following battles were fought in Sirhind.

 Battle of Sirhind (1555)
 Battle of Chappar Chiri, 1710
 Siege of Sirhind, 1710
 Battle of Harnaulgarh, 1762
 Battle of Sirhind (1764)

Lists of battles